Empire is the name of a clonally propagated cultivar of apple derived from a seed grown in 1945 by Lester C. Anderson, a Cornell University fruit nutritionist who conducted open pollination research on his various orchards.
In 1945, under the direction of A. J. Heinicke, scientists from the New York State Agricultural Experiment Station of Cornell University in Geneva, New York, harvested the Empire seed together with thousands of its siblings. The Geneva teams grew and tested ever dwindling sub-populations of the sibling group until 1966, when the final selection, the Empire, was released to the public at the New York Fruit Testing Association meetings in Geneva. According to the US Apple Association website it is one of the fifteen most popular apple cultivars in the United States.

Description
Apples are picked between September and October and can be stored until January. However, some apple growers including Verger Denis Charbonneau Mont-St-Grégoire, Quebec, Canada easily keep them until June under controlled refrigeration in a gas atmosphere. They still remain juicy, firm, crunchy and sweet.

The original seed was a cross between the varieties McIntosh and Red Delicious.  Empire apples are excellent for eating and salads, and good for sauce, baking, pies and freezing. It is an ideal lunch-box apple, not least because it does not bruise easily.

Sports patented in the US
By the year 2001, three mutant cultivars (sports) of Empire had received US plant patents.  None of them were mutants of mutants:

Disease susceptibility
Scab: high
Powdery mildew: high
Cedar apple rust: low
Fire blight: medium

References

External links
NY Apple country
 National Fruit Collection page

Apple cultivars with patented mutants
Cornell University